Grahamston Football Club was a Scottish association football club based in the village of Grahamston, Stirlingshire, now part of Falkirk. The club was founded in 1882 and disbanded in 1896. The club competed in the Scottish Cup for three seasons between 1885 and 1888 as well as the regional Stirlingshire Cup competition. From 1886, the club's home colours were cream shirts with navy shorts.

History 
Grahamston Football Club was founded in 1882 in the small industrial village of Grahamston, just north of Falkirk. The club played mostly friendly matches against clubs from nearby villages in its first season and joined the Stirlingshire Football Association in 1883–84, competing in the regional Stirlingshire Cup for the first time in February 1884, losing 1–0 to Strathblane in the first round. The following season, the club reached the semi-finals of the cup, losing 1–0 to Camelon for a place in the final.

In August 1885, the club was admitted to the Scottish Football Association and became eligible to compete in the Scottish Cup, entering the first round of the 1885–86 tournament a month later. Grahamston was drawn against Grasshoppers from Bonnybridge and drew the first match 2–2 away but lost the replay 4–2 at home. A year later, the club was again eliminated in the first round after losing 2–0 at home to Laurieston. The 1887–88 tournament was the last season Grahamston competed in the Scottish Cup. Drawn against Redding Athletic at home at Crichton Park in the first round, the club won the match 4–3, however, the result was protested because Grahamston fielded an unregistered player in the match and was subsequently disqualified so Redding Athletic qualified for the second round.

Grahamston continued to compete in the Stirlingshire Cup until 1889 and played friendly matches for several more years before eventually disbanding in 1896 after going out of business.

Scottish Cup record

1885–86 
 First round: drew 2–2 vs. Grasshoppers, 12 September 1885
 First round replay: lost 4–2 vs. Grasshoppers, 19 September 1885

1886–87 
 First round: lost 2–0 vs. Laurieston, 11 September 1886

1887–88 
 First round: won 4–3 vs. Redding Athletic, 3 September 1887

Notes

References 

Defunct football clubs in Scotland
Association football clubs established in 1882
1882 establishments in Scotland
Association football clubs disestablished in 1896
1896 disestablishments in Scotland
Sport in Falkirk